Beauport—Côte-de-Beaupré—Île d'Orléans—Charlevoix (formerly Montmorency—Charlevoix—Haute-Côte-Nord and Charlevoix—Montmorency)  is a federal electoral district in Quebec, Canada, that has been represented in the House of Commons of Canada since 2004. An earlier Charlevoix—Montmorency riding was represented in the House of Commons from 1917 to 1925.

Following the Canadian federal electoral redistribution, 2012, the riding was renamed Beauport—Côte-de-Beaupré—Île d'Orléans—Charlevoix from Montmorency—Charlevoix—Haute-Côte-Nord, with the eastern part of the riding becoming a part of the neighbouring riding of Manicouagan.

Geography

The riding, which extends along the north bank of the Saint Lawrence River northeast of Quebec City on either side of the Saguenay River, straddles the Quebec regions of Capitale-Nationale and Côte-Nord. It consists of the MRCs of Charlevoix, Charlevoix-Est, La Côte-de-Beaupré, L'Île-d'Orléans and La Haute-Côte-Nord, as well as a neighbourhood of southeastern Quebec City.

The neighbouring ridings are Beauport—Limoilou, Portneuf—Jacques-Cartier, Saint-Maurice—Champlain, Lac-Saint-Jean, Chicoutimi—Le Fjord, Manicouagan, Haute-Gaspésie—La Mitis—Matane—Matapédia, Rimouski-Neigette—Témiscouata—Les Basques, Montmagny—L'Islet—Kamouraska—Rivière-du-Loup and Bellechasse—Les Etchemins—Lévis.

Demographics
According to the Canada 2011 Census

Ethnic groups: 96.9% White, 2.1% Indigenous, 1.0% Other
Languages: 98.6% French, 0.7% English, 0.7% Other
Religions: 91.8% Christian, 0.3% Other, 7.9% None
Median income: $30,089 (2010) 
Average income: $35,622 (2010)

History

Boundaries
It was created in 2003 as Charlevoix—Montmorency from parts of Beauport—Montmorency—Côte-de-Beaupré—Île-d'Orléans, Charlesbourg—Jacques-Cartier and Charlevoix ridings. Its name was changed to Montmorency—Charlevoix—Haute-Côte-Nord after the 2004 election. The riding of Charlevoix—Montmorency also existed from 1914 to 1924. from parts of Charlevoix, Chicoutimi—Saguenay and Montmorency ridings. It initially consisted of the parishes of St. Tite, St. Féréol, St. Joachim, Château Richer, Ste. Anne and the village of Ste. Anne.

The electoral district was abolished in 1924 when it was redistributed into Charlevoix—Saguenay and Quebec—Montmorency ridings. Its only Member of Parliament was Pierre-François Casgrain of the Liberal Party of Canada. The renamed Beauport—Côte-de-Beaupré—Île d'Orléans—Charlevoix riding lost territory to Manicouagan and Beauport—Limoilou, and gained territory from Beauport—Limoilou during the 2012 electoral redistribution.

Members of Parliament

This riding has elected the following Members of Parliament:

Election results

Beauport—Côte-de-Beaupré—Île d'Orléans—Charlevoix, 2015–present

Montmorency—Charlevoix—Haute-Côte-Nord, 2006–2015

Charlevoix—Montmorency, 2004–2006

Charlevoix—Montmorency, 1917–1925

Note: Conservative vote is compared to Government vote in 1917 election, and Liberal vote is compared to Opposition vote

See also
 List of Canadian federal electoral districts
 Past Canadian electoral districts

External links

 Campaign expense data from Elections Canada
 2011 Results from Elections Canada
Riding history for Charlevoix—Montmorency from the Library of Parliament
Riding history for Montmorency—Charlevoix—Haute-Côte-Nord from the Library of Parliament

References

Quebec federal electoral districts
Baie-Saint-Paul
Federal electoral districts of Quebec City